Megan Connolly (born 7 March 1997) is a Republic of Ireland international footballer who plays for Brighton & Hove Albion.

Family
Connolly was raised in Cork, Ireland and is the daughter of Michael and Freda Connolly. Her father was a volunteer coach at College Corinthians and, after Megan began to show potential, he was responsible for reintroducing women's association football to the club. Her older brother Luke is also a footballer, playing association football for Corinthians and Gaelic football for Nemo Rangers GAA and UCC GAA. In 2014, he was a member of the UCC team that won the Sigerson Cup. He has also represented Cork at U-21 and senior level.

Playing career

Early years
Connolly began playing association football with College Corinthians at the age of six. Initially she played with boys' teams before her father helped set up teams for girls. She also showed potential as a Gaelic footballer, playing for Nemo Rangers GAA. In 2012, she was a member of the Cork GAA U-16 Ladies team that won the Munster U-16 Ladies' Championship. Connolly scored a hat-trick in the final as Cork beat Kerry by 5–6 to 0–10. In interviews, Connolly credited her Gaelic football training for helping her with general fitness. She eventually opted to concentrate on association football because it gave her the opportunity to represent Ireland at international level.

Playing association football as a schoolgirl, Connolly won honours at provincial and national level, representing both Corinthians and her high school, Christ King Girls Secondary School. On 16 November 2014 Connolly was a member of the College Corinthians senior women's team that won the Women's Munster Senior Cup. Her father, Michael Connolly, was the coach of the team and Connolly scored in the final.

Florida State Seminoles
In 2015 Connolly began playing for Florida State Seminoles after obtaining a four-year scholarship to Florida State University to study sports management. Compatriot Megan Campbell was involved in her recruitment. In her first season playing for the Seminoles, Connolly played a pivotal role in their 2015 ACC Women's Soccer Tournament success, contributing nine goals and ten assists. She subsequently received a number of individual awards including ACC Midfielder of the Year and ACC Freshman of the Year.

In December 2015 Connolly was named a First Team All-American by the National Soccer Coaches Association of America for her performances during the season, becoming the first ever freshman player from Florida State to do so. She was also nominated for the Hermann Trophy.

As a sophomore, Connolly played and started in all 22 games. She scored a total of seven goals, including five game-winners, and provided four assists. As a junior, she played in 20 games, starting nine, and finished fourth on the team with nine points on three goals and three assists.

Club career
On 26 January 2019, Connolly signed a contract with Brighton & Hove Albion WFC for the remainder of the season. She re-signed with Brighton for another year in July 2020.

International
Connolly has represented the Republic of Ireland at U-15, U-16, U-17, U-19 and senior level. She has been a regular goalscorer at youth international level. On 6 August 2013 during a 2014 UEFA Women's Under-17 Championship qualifier, Connolly scored a hat-trick in a 12–1 win against Bosnia and Herzegovina. Connolly was also a member of the Republic of Ireland team that won their group at the 2014 UEFA Women's Under-19 Championship and qualified for the semi-finals. On 21 July 2014 Connolly scored a "wondrous free kick" which proved to be the winner in a 2–1 win against Sweden. This earned the Republic of Ireland their place in the semi–final. With three assists, including two against England, and this goal, Connolly was described as "one of the stars of the tournament".

In 2014, she was named the Under-19 Women's International Player of the Year at the FAI International Football Awards and was presented with the award by Shay Given. On 17 September 2015 she scored four goals against Bulgaria in a 2016 UEFA Women's Under-19 Championship qualifier. Connolly was included in the senior Republic of Ireland squad for the 2015 Istria Cup. She made her senior international debut for the Republic of Ireland in a friendly against the United States on 23 January 2016. Connolly came on as a substitute for Ruesha Littlejohn after 65 minutes. The United States won 5–0.

International Goals

Table below list Ireland's goal tally first at scores and results.

Honours

Team

Cork GAA
Munster U–16 Ladies Championship
Winners: 2012: 1

College Corinthians
Women's Munster Senior Cup
Winners: 2014–15: 1

Florida State Seminoles
ACC Women's Soccer Tournament
Winners: 2015: 1

Individual
 FAI International Football Awards Under-19 Women's International Player of the Year
 2014, 2015
 2015 ACC Freshman of the Year
 2015 ACC Midfielder of the Year
 2015 NSCAA First Team All-American

References

External links

Megan Connolly at UEFA
Megan Connolly at Football Association of Ireland (FAI)
 

1997 births
Living people
Republic of Ireland women's association footballers
Florida State Seminoles women's soccer players
Nemo Rangers Gaelic footballers
Association footballers from Cork (city)
Republic of Ireland expatriate association footballers
Cork ladies' Gaelic footballers
College Corinthians A.F.C. players
Republic of Ireland women's international footballers
Expatriate women's soccer players in the United States
Gaelic footballers who switched code
Women's association football midfielders
Women's association football forwards
Brighton & Hove Albion W.F.C. players
Ladies' Gaelic footballers who switched code
Republic of Ireland women's youth international footballers